{{DISPLAYTITLE:N,N'-Di-n-butylthiourea}}

N,N′-Di-n-butylthiourea is an organic compound with the formula S=C(N(H)Bu)2 (Bu = butyl). A symmetrical N,N′-dialkyl thiourea derivative, it is a white solid.  Like other thiourea derivatives, it features a planar core. The C=S bond distance is 1.712(2) Å, while C−N distances are in range of 1.33 to 1.46 Å. Molecules of this compound exhibit syn-anti conformation.

Synthesis
N,N′-Di-n-butylthiourea can be obtained in these routes:
 Reaction of n-butylamine with carbon disulfide in the presence of alumina.
 Reaction of n-butylamine and n-butylisothiocyanate.

References

Thioureas